Siorapaluup Kangerlua, also known as Robertson Fjord and Robertson Bay, is a fjord in northern Greenland. To the southwest, the fjord opens into the Murchison Sound of the Baffin Bay. Administratively it belongs to the Avannaata municipality.

The settlement of Siorapaluk is located in the northern shore of the fjord.

History
In 1920 a spot in the shore of the fjord was chosen by Lauge Koch as a base during his expedition to Peary Land further north.

Geography
Siorapaluup Kangerlua, together with MacCormick Fjord close to the east, is one of the two main indentations of the northern side of the Murchison Sound. It runs in a roughly NE/SW direction with its mouth southeast of Cape Robertson, beyond the western end of the Inglefield Gulf and south of the unnamed fjord where the Morris Jesup Glacier has its terminus.

The waters of the fjord are very deep. There are impressive cliffs lining the fjord's shores near its head, where the Meehan Glacier and the Verhoeff Glacier discharge from the Greenland Ice Sheet.

See also
List of fjords of Greenland
Siorapaluk Heliport

References

External links
Little Auk hunting in the Thule area, Greenland - Seabird harvest
Coastline from Robertson fjord to Foulke Fjord - BirdLife Data Zone
Lauge Koch: pioneer geo-explorer of Greenland's far north - jstor

Fjords of Greenland